Asikkala is a municipality of Finland. Its seat is in Vääksy, at the shores of the Lake Päijänne. It is located in the province of Southern Finland and is part of the Päijänne Tavastia region. Asikkala's neighboring municipalities are Hämeenlinna, Heinola, Hollola, Lahti, Padasjoki and Sysmä.

The municipality is unilingually Finnish, by law since 1996.

History 
The oldest prehistoric objects discovered in Asikkala, primarily tools, are presumed to date back to approximately 3000 BCE. The island of Kotasaari in the village of Kalkkinen has been a significant source of finds as well; the settlement on the island dates back to the Stone Age. In the Middle Age, the hunters populating the area of Asikkala made excursions towards the north on the Päijänne. The oldest villages in the municipality are presumed to be Kalkkinen as well as Anianpelto, the former of which also housed the largest estate in the area, known as Iisakkila or Kalkkinen.

Asikkala is mentioned in writing for the first time in a document concerning a border dispute with Sysmä in 1443. It is mentioned in 1445 as an administrative parish, whose subordinates in taxation included the villages of Viitaila, Asikkala and Urajärvi, and later Ruuhijärvi in modern-day Nastola. In the early 1600s, Asikkala became an independent chapel parish from the mother parish of Hollola.

Geography

Villages

In 1967, Asikkala had 24 legally recognized villages (henkikirjakylät):

 Anianpelto
 Asikkala
 Hillilä
 Iso-Äiniö
 Joenniemi
 Kalkkinen
 Keltaniemi
 Kopsuo
 Kurhila
 Muikkula
 Myllykselä
 Paakkola
 Pulkkila
 Pätiälä
 Reivilä
 Riihilahti
 Salo
 Särkijärvi
 Urajärvi
 Vehkoo
 Vesivehmaa
 Viitaila
 Vähimaa
 Vähä-Äiniö

Demographics 
In 2020, 13.3% of the population of Asikkala was under the age of 15, 52.7% were aged 15 to 64, and 34.0% were over the age of 64. The average age was 49.9, above the national average of 43.4 and regional average of 46.1. Speakers of Finnish made up 97.4% of the population and speakers of Swedish made up 0.2%, while the share of speakers of foreign languages was 2.4%. Foreign nationals made up 1.8% of the total population. 

The chart below, describing the development of the total population of Asikkala from 1975-2020, encompasses the municipality's area as of 2021.

Urban areas 
In 2019, out of the total population of 8,083, 5,188 people lived in urban areas and 2,814 in sparsely populated areas, while the coordinates of 81 people were unknown. This made Asikkala's degree of urbanization 64.8%. The urban population in the municipality was divided between two urban areas as follows:

Notable people

Politics
Results of the 2011 Finnish parliamentary election in Asikkala:

True Finns   26.8%
Centre Party   20.8%
National Coalition Party   20.5%
Social Democratic Party   15.2%
Christian Democrats   8.1%
Left Alliance   4.0%
Green League   3.7%

Economy 
In 2018, 9.6% of the workforce of Asikkala worked in primary production (agriculture, forestry and fishing), 28.7% in secondary production (e.g. manufacturing, construction and infrastructure), and 58.6% in services. In 2019, the unemployment rate was 9.2%, and the share of pensioners in the population was 37.4%. 

The ten largest employers in Asikkala in 2019 were as follows:

Culture

Food 
In the 1980s, Asikkala's traditional parish dishes were salmon soup, rieskas made barley, and potato egg butter, as well as berry milk and sahti.

See also 
 Päijänne Tavastia Aviation Museum

Notes

References

External links
 
 Municipality of Asikkala – Official site in Finnish

 
Populated places established in 1848